Miguel Ángel Britos Cabrera (born 17 July 1985) is a Uruguayan former professional footballer who played as a centre back.

Club career

Fénix
Britos began his professional career playing with Fénix in 2005. After playing the 2005–06 Uruguayan Primera División season, his team was relegated to the Uruguayan Segunda División.

Juventud
On 1 July 2006, Britos was transferred to Juventud de Las Piedras, where he achieved the promotion to the 2007–08 Uruguayan Top Division season.

Wanderers
On 1 July 2007, Britos signed a new contract with Montevideo Wanderers.

Bologna
Britos then moved to Italy on 22 July 2008 where he played for Bologna in the Serie A, signing a five-year contract for a €2 million transfer fee. He made his Serie A debut on 21 September 2008 against Fiorentina. On 21 February 2009, he scored his first Serie A goal against Inter.

Napoli
Britos' talent did not go unnoticed, and he was subsequently purchased from Bologna by Napoli on 12 July 2011 in a €9 million transfer deal, signing a four-year contract. He scored his first goal for Napoli in a 2–0 home win over Chievo on 13 February 2012. Growing into an invaluable asset for Walter Mazzarri's side, Britos featured in the final of the Coppa Italia on 20 May 2012, as Napoli defeated Serie A champions Juventus 2–0.

On 23 May 2015, he headbutted Álvaro Morata in a 3–1 away defeat to Juventus, and was sent off.

Watford
On 22 July 2015, Britos joined newly promoted English side Watford on a three-year deal. He was sent off on his debut against Preston North End in the League Cup on 25 August 2015.

His contract with Watford was extended at the end of the 2017–18 season, running until June 2019, after the club exercised an option.

Britos left Watford in July 2019 and retired from football age 33, citing lack of motivation.

Club statistics

Honours
Juventud
Torneo di Viareggio: 2006

Napoli
Coppa Italia: 2011–12, 2013–14
Supercoppa Italiana: 2014

Notes

References

External links

 Profile at tenfieldigital

1985 births
Living people
Uruguayan footballers
Uruguayan expatriate footballers
Association football defenders
Uruguayan Primera División players
Uruguayan Segunda División players
Serie A players
Premier League players
Centro Atlético Fénix players
Juventud de Las Piedras players
Montevideo Wanderers F.C. players
Bologna F.C. 1909 players
S.S.C. Napoli players
Watford F.C. players
Expatriate footballers in Italy
Expatriate footballers in England
Uruguayan expatriate sportspeople in England